Hush hush or hush-hush may refer to:

 Hush, Hush (series), young adult novels by Becca Fitzpatrick
 Hush, Hush, the first novel of the series
 Hush Hush (Kentucky Knife Fight album), a 2013 album by Kentucky Knife Fight
 "Hush Hush" (Alexis Jordan song), a 2011 song by Alexis Jordan
 "Hush Hush; Hush Hush", a 2008 song by The Pussycat Dolls
 HushHush, a Philippine television drama series that debuted in 2008
 Disques Hushush, an independent record label
 Hush-Hush, a nickname for the LNER Class W1 experimental high pressure steam locomotive
 "Hush-Hush" (Jimmy Reed song), 1960 song
 Hush Hush (TV series), an Indian television series

See also 
 Hush (disambiguation)
 Hush… Hush, Sweet Charlotte (disambiguation)